Andrew Rickman OBE is an entrepreneur in the field of silicon photonics. He is the founder and executive chairman of Rockley Photonics based in the UK, having resigned as CEO on December 12, 2022.  As CEO, he took Rockley Photonics public through a SPAC merger with a valuation of over one billion dollars.  He was Britain’s first Internet billionaire.

Education
Rickman has a mechanical engineering degree from Imperial College, London; a PhD in silicon photonics from Surrey University, an MBA from Cranfield University and honorary doctorates from Surrey, Edinburgh Napier and Kingston Universities. He is a Chartered Engineer.

Career and business ventures
Rickman was previously the CEO and Chairman of Bookham Technology, the first company to commercialise silicon photonics. He founded Bookham Technology in 1988, and it grew rapidly from a start-up to a FTSE100 company before its valuation crashed as the dotcom bubble burst in 2000.  He left Bookham in 2005. 

Rickman was also Chairman of Kotura Inc., and currently serves as executive chairman of Rockley Photonics.

Honours and awards
Rickman was awarded an OBE for services to the telecommunications industry, and is a winner of the Royal Academy of Engineering Silver Medal for his outstanding contribution to British Engineering.  In 2000, Rickman was named UK Technology and Communications Entrepreneur of the Year by Ernst and Young.

Other achievements
In 2011, Rickman was awarded an Honorary Professorship at SIMIT, Chinese Academy of Sciences. Rickman has held advisory board positions with the East Asia Institute of the University of Cambridge and Applied Science and Technology Research Institute of Hong Kong.

References

Living people
Year of birth missing (living people)
Alumni of Imperial College London
Alumni of the University of Surrey
Officers of the Order of the British Empire
British telecommunications industry businesspeople
Chief executives in the technology industry